Laurent Crost (born 5 May 1970) is a French judoka. Crost was 1994 European Champion open category. The heavyweight won the Hungarian and Swiss Open title and won two French senior titles. He was World Team champion in 1994 with France and European team champion in 1996. Crost won World Military bronze in 1992.

Achievements

External links
 

1970 births
Living people
French male judoka
20th-century French people